Streptomyces racemochromogenes is a bacterium species from the genus of Streptomyces. Streptomyces racemochromogenes produces phospholipase D, the acemomycine complex and the streptothricin complex.

See also 
 List of Streptomyces species

References

Further reading

External links
Type strain of Streptomyces racemochromogenes at BacDive -  the Bacterial Diversity Metadatabase

racemochromogenes
Bacteria described in 1956